Antiochus XI Epiphanes Philadelphus (died 93 BC) was a Seleucid monarch who reigned as King of Syria between 94 and 93 BC, during the Hellenistic period. He was the son of AntiochusVIII and his wife Tryphaena. AntiochusXI's early life was a time of constant civil war between his father and his uncle AntiochusIX. The conflict ended with the assassination of AntiochusVIII, followed by the establishment of AntiochusIX in Antioch, the capital of Syria. AntiochusVIII's eldest son SeleucusVI, in control of western Cilicia, marched against his uncle and had him killed, taking Antioch for himself, only to be expelled from it and driven to his death in 94 BC by AntiochusIX's son AntiochusX.

Following the murder of SeleucusVI, AntiochusXI declared himself king jointly with his twin brother PhilipI. Dubious ancient accounts, which may be contradicted by archaeological evidence, report that AntiochusXI's first act was to avenge his late brother by destroying Mopsuestia in Cilicia, the city responsible for the death of SeleucusVI. In 93 BC, AntiochusXI took Antioch, an event not mentioned by ancient historians but confirmed through numismatic evidence. AntiochusXI appears to have been the senior king, minting coinage as a sole king and reigning alone in the capital, while PhilipI remained in Cilicia, but kept his royal title. AntiochusXI may have restored the temple of Apollo and Artemis in Daphne, but his reign did not last long. In the autumn of the same year, AntiochusX regrouped and counter-attacked; AntiochusXI was defeated and drowned in the Orontes River as he tried to flee.

Name, family and early life

The name Antiochus is of Greek etymology and means "resolute in contention". The capital of Syria, Antioch, was named after Antiochus, father of the city's founder, King SeleucusI (reigned 305–281 BC); this name became dynastic and many Seleucid kings bore it. In  AntiochusVIII married the Ptolemaic princess Tryphaena, who died in 109 BC. The couple had many children, including SeleucusVI, the eldest; AntiochusXI and PhilipI; their younger brother DemetriusIII; and the youngest AntiochusXII. The mother of PhilipI was mentioned explicitly as Tryphaena by the fourth-century historian Eusebius, who also mentioned that AntiochusXI and PhilipI were twins (didymoi). AntiochusXI's date of birth is unknown, but by the time he came to power he was at least in his twenties.

In 113 BC, Antiochus IX declared himself king and started a civil war against his half-brother AntiochusVIII. The conflict between the brothers would last a decade and a half; it claimed the life of Tryphaena and ended with the assassination of AntiochusVIII at the hands of his minister Herakleon of Beroia in 96 BC. In the aftermath of AntiochusVIII's death, AntiochusIX took the capital Antioch and married AntiochusVIII's second wife and widow, Cleopatra Selene. The sons of AntiochusVIII responded; DemetriusIII took Damascus and ruled it, while SeleucusVI killed AntiochusIX in 95 BC and took Antioch. The new king was defeated by AntiochusIX's son AntiochusX ( BC), who took the capital. SeleucusVI escaped to Mopsuestia in Cilicia where he was killed by rebels in 94 BC.

Reign

The reigns of the late Seleucid kings are poorly attested in ancient literature through brief passages and summaries, often riddled with conflations and contradictions; the numismatic evidence is therefore the primary source when reconstructing the reigns of late Seleucid monarchs. During SeleucusVI's reign, AntiochusXI and his twin probably resided in Cilicia. In the aftermath of SeleucusVI's death, AntiochusXI and PhilipI declared themselves kings in 94 BC; the historian Alfred Bellinger suggested that their base was a coastal city north of Antioch, while Arthur Houghton believed it was Beroea, because the city's rulers were PhilipI's allies.

It is more likely that Tarsus was the main base of operations; both AntiochusXI and PhilipI's portraits appeared on the obverses of jugate coins they struck, and all the jugate coins were minted in Cilicia. Three series of jugate coins are known; as of 2008, one series has six known surviving specimens, depicting both kings with beards. The excellent craftsmanship of the portraits depicted on the coins of the six specimen series indicates that the minting facility was located in a city that was a center of culture, making Tarsus the likely site of the mint and so the probable base of operations.

The other two coin series have fewer surviving specimens and depict AntiochusXI with a sideburn. Those coins were not minted in Tarsus, and the sideburn indicates that those issues were produced by cities west of the main base, as the king passed them on his way to Tarsus; by the time AntiochusXI arrived at his headquarters, he was depicted with a full beard. On all jugate coins, AntiochusXI was portrayed in front of PhilipI, his name taking precedence, showing that he was the senior monarch. According to Josephus, AntiochusXI became king before PhilipI, but the numismatic evidence suggests otherwise, as the earliest coins show both brothers ruling jointly.

Epithets and royal image

Hellenistic monarchs did not use regnal numbers but usually employed epithets to distinguish themselves from other kings with similar names; the numbering of kings is mostly a modern practice. On his coins, AntiochusXI appeared with the epithets Epiphanes (God Manifest) and Philadelphus (Brother-Loving). Epiphanes served to emphasize AntiochusXI's paternity as a son of AntiochusVIII, who bore the same epithet; while Philadelphus was probably a sign of respect to SeleucusVI and PhilipI. The beard sported by AntiochusXI on his jugate coins from Tarsus is probably a sign of mourning and the intention to avenge SeleucusVI's death. The last issue of AntiochusXI from Antioch depicts him beardless, highlighting that the vow was fulfilled.

Drawing his legitimacy from his father, Antiochus XI appeared on his coinage with an exaggerated hawked nose, in the likeness of AntiochusVIII. The iconography of AntiochusXI's portrait was part of the tryphé-king tradition, heavily used by AntiochusVIII. The ruler's portrait express tryphé (luxury and magnificence), where his unattractive features and stoutness are emphasized. The tradition of tryphé images started in Egypt, and was later adopted in Syria. The Romans considered the tryphé portraits as evidence of the degeneracy and decadence of Hellenistic kings; the softness depicted in the portraits was seen as a sign of the rulers' incompetence, a way to explain the decline of the Hellenistic dynasties. However, the Roman view is not factual; those images were an intentional policy in a kingdom ravaged by civil war. Most late Seleucid monarchs, including AntiochusXI, spent their reigns fighting, causing havoc in their lands. The image of a warrior king on coins, as was customary for Hellenistic Bactrian kings for example, would have alienated the already impoverished population suffering the consequences of war. The people needed peace and copiousness, and the tryphé portrait was an attempt to imply that the king and his people were living a pleasurable life. By employing the tryphé image, AntiochusXI suggested that he would be a successful and popular king like his father.

Avenging Seleucus VI and taking the capital

According to Eusebius, the brothers sacked Mopsuestia and destroyed it to avenge SeleucusVI. Eusebius's statement is doubtful because in 86 BC, Rome conferred inviolability upon the cult of Isis and Sarapis in Mopsuestia, which is proven by an inscription from the city. After Mopsuestia, AntiochusXI left PhilipI in Cilicia and advanced on Antioch, driving AntiochusX from the city at the beginning of 93 BC. Ancient historians do not note AntiochusXI's reign in the capital, stating that he fought against AntiochusX and was defeated. The 6th-century Byzantine monk and historian John Malalas, whose work is considered generally unreliable by scholars, mentions the reign of AntiochusXI in his account of the Roman period in Antioch. The material evidence for AntiochusXI's success in taking the capital was provided in 1912, when an account of a coin struck by him in Antioch was published.

Philip I did not take residence in the capital and AntiochusXI minted coinage as a sole king. PhilipI kept the royal title while remaining in the city which was his base during the preparations to avenge SeleucusVI. The numismatist Edward Theodore Newell assigned AntiochusXI a reign of a few weeks in the capital, but according to the numismatist Oliver Hoover, estimating the average annual die usage rate of the King suggests a reign of several months. According to Malalas, King Antiochus Philadelphus, i.e. AntiochusXI, built a temple for Apollo and Artemis in Daphne, and set up two golden statues representing the gods, as well as conferring the right of asylum to anyone who took refuge in the temple; this statement cannot be correct since the temple was attested during the time of AntiochusIII ( BC). The historian Glanville Downey, observing Malalas's writing style in Greek, suggested that by "building", Malalas meant renovating or restoring, which indicates that a predecessor of AntiochusXI may have desecrated the temple and melted down the golden statues.

End and succession

By autumn 93 BC, Antiochus X counter-attacked, defeating AntiochusXI, who drowned in the Orontes River as he tried to flee. Ancient accounts dealing with the last battle differ: according to the first-century historian Josephus, AntiochusXI fought alone, while Eusebius has both AntiochusXI and PhilipI in the battle. Eusebius failed to note the reign of AntiochusXI in Antioch, stating that the final battle took place immediately after the destruction of Mopsuestia; a statement contradicted by numismatic evidence. In the view of Bellinger, the brothers' combined armies must have been deployed, but since only AntiochusXI perished, it is probable that PhilipI stayed behind at his capital with AntiochusXI leading the armies in the field.

Nothing is known regarding Antiochus XI's marriages or children. According to the first century biographer Plutarch, the first-century BC Roman general Lucullus said that the Armenian king, TigranesII, who conquered Syria in 83BC, "put to death the successors of Seleucus, and [carried] off their wives and daughters into captivity". Ancient sources regarding the late Seleucid period are fragmentary and do not mention many details. Therefore, the statement of Lucullus makes it possible that a wife or daughters of AntiochusXI existed, and that they were taken by the Armenian king. Following his victory, AntiochusX regained the capital and ruled it until his death.

Family tree

|-
|style="text-align: left;"|Citations:

|-

See also

 List of Syrian monarchs
 Timeline of Syrian history

Notes

References

Citations

Sources

External links

 Several coins of Antiochus XI exhibited in the blog of the numismatist Jayseth Guberman.
 The biography of Antiochus XI in the website of the numismatist Petr Veselý.
 An engraved gem. Property of The Museum of Fine Arts, Boston. It depicts either AntiochusXI or DemetriusIII.

93 BC deaths
1st-century BC Seleucid rulers
Antiochus 11
Antiochus 11
1st-century BC rulers in Asia
Year of birth unknown
Antiochus 11
Syrian twins